Socrates, son of Sathon was hipparch of the ile of Hetairoi from Apollonia, since at least the beginning of the Asiatic expedition. He fought in the Battle of the Granicus.

References

Who's Who in the Age of Alexander the Great (2006) by Waldemar Heckel 

Hetairoi
Generals of Alexander the Great

Ancient Chalcidicians